The 2012 Men's Arab Volleyball Championship was the 18th edition of the Arab Volleyball Championship. It was held in Bahrain from 6 November to 13 November, 2012.

Teams

Group stage
The draw was held on 19 October 2012.

Group A

|}

|}

Group B

|}

|}

Final round

Classification 5–8 places

Seventh place match

|}

Fifth place match

|}

Championship bracket

Semifinals

|}

Bronze medal match

|}

Final

|}

Final standing

Awards
Best Scorer:  Fadhel Abbas
Best Spiker:  Elyes Karamosly
Best Blocker:  Marouane Garci
Best Server:  Hassan Dhahi
Best Setter:  Mehdi Ben Cheikh
Best Receiver:  Fouad Al Maaroug
Best Libero:  Aymen Harouna

References

  Schedule of the 2012 Arab volleyball championship  (Tunisian Volleyball Federation)
  Group stage: results and ranking  (Tunisian Volleyball Federation)

External links
 Official AVA website

Men's Arab Volleyball Championship
Arab Volleyball Championship 
Men's Arab Volleyball Championship
International volleyball competitions hosted by Bahrain